Hypotrix vigasia is a moth of the family Noctuidae. It is found in Veracruz in south-eastern Mexico.

Poole (1989) listed H. vigasia as a synonym of Bombyx agavis Blasquez, 1870; however, the location of the types of Bombyx agavis, if any exist, is unknown and the original paintings (Blasquez, 1870, Figs 6, 9) are not identifiable as a noctuid and may be a cossid.

External links
A revision of the genus Hypotrix Guenée in North America with descriptions of four new species and a new genus (Lepidoptera, Noctuidae, Noctuinae, Eriopygini)

Hypotrix
Moths described in 1894